David Paul M. Marcelo (born February 22, 1989) is a Filipino professional basketball player for the TNT Tropang Giga of the Philippine Basketball Association (PBA). Marcelo was drafted by B-Meg in the 2012 PBA draft as the 12th overall pick.

College career
Marcelo studied and played for the San Beda Red Lions from 2007 from 2011 together graduated with Garvo Lanete and Mar Villahermosa. The Red Lions won 4 out of 5 championships with them. He was well known for his inside scoring and rebounding.

On his last year with the Red Lions, they faced the JRU Heavy Bombers in the semifinals after beating San Sebastian Stags in the top-seed playoff. They won over the Heavy Bombers, 83–74, to advance to the Finals then the Stags won over the Letran Knights in the second game of their semifinals, 63–56. The Part III of the Red Lions–Stags rivalry started when the Red Lions won 75–63 in Game One. In Game Two of the Finals, there was a hard-fought battle when they outscored the Stags in the low-scoring fourth quarter, 9–5, as Pascual missed a three-point field goal that could have won over the Red Lions as the Red Lions won, 57–55, to get their 16th championship, tying Letran.

Amateur career
Marcelo played for the NLEX Road Warriors in the PBA Developmental League also together with Lanete. In his last conference with the Road Warriors, they completed a 13–0 sweep at the end of the conference.

Professional career

Barako Bull Energy (2012–2015)
Marcelo declared himself for the 2012 PBA draft. There, he was drafted 12th overall by the Barako Bull Energy Cola.

Barangay Ginebra San Miguel (2015–2017)
In April 2015, Marcelo was traded to Barangay Ginebra San Miguel in exchange for Billy Mamaril who was later dealt to San Miguel Beermen in exchange for Rico Maierhofer in a complex 4-team 6-players blockbuster trade that involved GlobalPort Batang Pier, where he was reunited with his former college coach at San Beda, Frankie Lim.

PBA career statistics

As of the end of 2021 season

Season-by-season averages

|-
| align=left | 
| align=left | Barako Bull
| 15 || 9.6 || .500 || – || .455 || 2.8 || .4 || .3 || .5 || 2.5
|-
| align=left | 
| align=left | Barako Bull
| 27 || 10.7 || .460 || 1.000 || .400 || 2.7 || .4 || .3 || .5 || 1.9
|-
| align=left rowspan=2| 
| align=left | Barako Bull
| rowspan=2|36 || rowspan=2|19.0 || rowspan=2|.433 || rowspan=2|– || rowspan=2|.661 || rowspan=2|3.6 || rowspan=2|.6 || rowspan=2|.6 || rowspan=2|.6 || rowspan=2|4.8
|-
| align=left | Barangay Ginebra
|-
| align=left | 
| align=left | Barangay Ginebra
| 44 || 9.8 || .447 || .000 || .541 || 1.8 || .4 || .3 || .3 || 2.4
|-
| align=left rowspan=2| 
| align=left | Barangay Ginebra
| rowspan=2|49 || rowspan=2|11.5 || rowspan=2|.457 || rowspan=2|.000 || rowspan=2|.600 || rowspan=2|2.5 || rowspan=2|.5 || rowspan=2|.3 || rowspan=2|.6 || rowspan=2|3.4
|-
| align=left | Blackwater
|-
| align=left rowspan=2| 
| align=left | Blackwater
| rowspan=2|30 || rowspan=2|9.9 || rowspan=2|.382 || rowspan=2|.364 || rowspan=2|.440 || rowspan=2|1.9 || rowspan=2|.4 || rowspan=2|.3 || rowspan=2|.4 || rowspan=2|2.4
|-
| align=left | NLEX
|-
| align=left | 
| align=left | Phoenix
| 37 || 10.9 || .484 || .308 || .590 || 2.1 || .4 || .5 || .5 || 3.2
|-
| align=left | 
| align=left | Phoenix
| 15 || 7.5 || .400 || .222 || .636 || 1.8 || .6 || .4 || .9 || 1.7
|-
| align=left | 
| align=left | TNT
| 30 || 10.5 || .479 || .200 || .639 || 2.7 || .2 || .4 || .4 || 3.2
|-class=sortbottom
| align=center colspan=2 | Career
| 283 || 11.4 || .450 || .288 || .584 || 2.4 || .4 || .4 || .5 || 3.0

References

1989 births
Living people
Barako Bull Energy players
Barangay Ginebra San Miguel players
Blackwater Bossing players
Centers (basketball)
Filipino men's basketball players
San Beda Red Lions basketball players
NLEX Road Warriors players
People from Santa Mesa
Philippines men's national basketball team players
Power forwards (basketball)
Basketball players from Manila
Southeast Asian Games gold medalists for the Philippines
Southeast Asian Games medalists in basketball
Phoenix Super LPG Fuel Masters players
Competitors at the 2011 Southeast Asian Games
Magnolia Hotshots draft picks
TNT Tropang Giga players